Banaras is a 2022 Indian Kannada-language romance film written and directed by Jayatheertha and produced by Tilakraj Ballal. It stars Zaid Khan and Sonal Monteiro in the lead roles. The film's music composer is B. Ajaneesh Loknath and cinematographer is Advaitha Gurumurthy. The film was set to be released early 2021 but was postponed due to COVID-19 pandemic, It was released on November 4, 2022.

Plot
Banaras is a poignant love story set in the back drop of Kashi. This film also the debut of Zaid Khan. The most of the film's scenes have been shot in Banaras except a few portions canned in Bengaluru.

Cast
 Zaid Khan as Sidharth Simha
 Sonal Monteiro as Dhani
 Sujay Shastry as Shambu
 Devaraj as Ajay Simha
 Achyuth Kumar as Narayan Shastry
 Barkath Ali as Peter Jakson
 Sapna Raj as Shiva

Production
TBA

Release 
Banaras was released in cinemas on 4 November 2022 in Kannada along with a Hindi dubbed version.

Music

The film's music is composed by B. Ajaneesh Loknath. The music rights are owned by Lahari Music and T-Series for Hindi and South languages.

Reception 
TBA

See also 
 List of films impacted by the COVID-19 pandemic

References

External links 
 

Indian romance films
Film productions suspended due to the COVID-19 pandemic
Films shot in Varanasi
Films directed by Jayatheertha